Iridomyrmex victorianus is a species of ant in the genus Iridomyrmex. Described by Forel in 1902, the species distributed to the east coast in Australia. The species usually takes an opportunity of using other nests constructed by larger ants, usually abandoned, and some were found in a bull ant nest (Myrmecia pyriformis).

References

Iridomyrmex
Hymenoptera of Australia
Insects described in 1902